Carl Joseph Hayman (born 14 November 1979) is a retired New Zealand rugby union footballer who played at tighthead prop. Hayman has previously played for the Highlanders in Super Rugby, Otago in the NPC, and Newcastle Falcons in the English Premiership, as well as making 45 appearances for New Zealand at international level. Hayman announced his retirement from professional rugby in January 2015, aged 35. Post retirement Hayman has been diagnosed with early-onset dementia and probable chronic traumatic encephalopathy.

Professional career and the All Blacks
He became the 1000th All Black when he made his debut against Samoa in 2001. Since then he established himself as one of the elite props in world rugby. In 2005, Hayman played for the New Zealand Māori, against Fiji in Suva and against the British & Irish Lions at Hamilton. In 2006 he was shortlisted as one of 5 candidates for New Zealand Player of the Year. On 19 April 2007 it was announced that Hayman had signed a three-year contract with Premiership Rugby side Newcastle Falcons, turning down an offer from league champions Sale Sharks to do so.

A club source said of the signing "every top club in Europe has been chasing him, but he’s chosen to come to Newcastle and we’re delighted he has made that decision". Hayman is strong enough to box squat 250 kg (550 lb).

Toulon
On 22 March 2010, it was announced that Hayman would join French club Toulon at the end of the season. He became one of a number of high-profile players that signed for Toulon alongside Jonny Wilkinson, Juan Martín Fernández Lobbe, Felipe Contepomi and Joe Van Niekerk.
The decision to stay in Europe made him ineligible for the 2011 Rugby World Cup due to the New Zealand Rugby Union's policy of only selecting players who have played in the New Zealand domestic competition.

In 2010, he was selected in the Barbarians squad to play Tonga on 26 November. In May 2013 he started as Toulon won the 2013 Heineken Cup Final by 16–15 against Clermont Auvergne.

On 6 January 2015, Hayman announced his retirement from professional rugby at the end of the 2014–15 Top 14 season.

References

External links
 
 
 
Scrum.com

1979 births
Living people
New Zealand international rugby union players
New Zealand rugby union players
Highlanders (rugby union) players
Rugby union props
Newcastle Falcons players
RC Toulonnais players
Māori All Blacks players
People educated at King's High School, Dunedin
People from Ōpunake
Rugby union players from Taranaki
Expatriate sportspeople in England
New Zealand expatriate sportspeople in France